Rhys James Turner (born 22 July 1995) is an English former professional footballer who plays as a striker for Lancaster City.

Career

Early career
Turner was born in Preston, Lancashire. He had spells with Preston North End and Lancaster City before he joined Stockport County as an 18-year-old from Myerscough College after scoring 63 goals the previous season.

Oldham Athletic
On 31 January 2014, Turner signed for Oldham Athletic for an undisclosed fee on an 18-month contract. Turner had several hamstring injuries at the start of the 2014–15 season, which caused him to miss most games up to January 2015. Turner made his first start of the season away at Leyton Orient on 21 February 2015 on the right wing but was replaced in the 60th minute due to another injury. His next appearance came on 17 March 2015 in which he replaced Conor Wilkinson; he scored his first goal for Oldham in this match, with a neat finish into the bottom corner. He started the next two games and scored two goals against local rivals Rochdale.

Turner joined League Two club York City on 17 September 2015 on a one-month loan, and debuted two days later as a starter in a 2–2 home draw with Carlisle United. He scored his only goal for York in the 38th minute of his next appearance, in a 2–1 home defeat to Oxford United on 29 September 2015, with a simple finish following confusion between Sam Slocombe and Johnny Mullins in the penalty area. Having made nine appearances and scored one goal at York, Turner returned to Oldham on 27 November 2015, after a change of management at York.

Turner joined National League club Macclesfield Town on 7 January 2016 on a one-month loan, making his debut two days later as a 76th-minute substitute for Chris Holroyd in a 1–0 home defeat to F.C. Halifax Town. He scored on his next appearance, with a goal in the 78th minute of Macclesfield's 2–2 away draw Truro City in the FA Trophy on 16 January 2016. However, he lost his place in the team with an ankle injury, but after recovering the loan was extended for a second month on 2 February 2016. He completed the loan spell with one goal from five appearances. Turner was released by Oldham when his contract expired at the end of 2015–16.

Morecambe
Turner signed a two-year contract with League Two club Morecambe on 10 July 2016. On 2 January 2018, he rejoined National League North club Stockport County on loan for the rest of the 2017–18 season. He was released by Morecambe at the end of the 2017–18 season.

Barrow
Turner signed for National League club Barrow on 11 July 2018 on a one-year contract.
He retired from football after a succession of injuries.

Career statistics

References

External links

1995 births
Living people
Footballers from Preston, Lancashire
English footballers
Association football forwards
Preston North End F.C. players
Lancaster City F.C. players
Stockport County F.C. players
Oldham Athletic A.F.C. players
York City F.C. players
Macclesfield Town F.C. players
Morecambe F.C. players
Barrow A.F.C. players
National League (English football) players
English Football League players